Sol SA Lineas Aereas, operating as  DBA Flyest Lineas Aereas (IATA code: FQ) was an Argentine airline company.

History
The airline was established during 2017 as a subsidiary of Spanish airline Air Nostrum. In November 2020, Flyest filed for bankruptcy due to the impact of coronavirus and related restrictions on air travel in Argentina.

Fleet 
The airline once owned two Bombardier CRJ200.

See also
Aerolíneas Argentinas
Austral Líneas Aéreas
Flybondi

External links
 Website Flyest (spanish), accessdate 19 September 2020

References

Defunct airlines of Argentina
Airlines established in 2017
Airlines disestablished in 2020
Argentine companies established in 2017
2020 disestablishments in Argentina
Argentine brands